Thomas P. Foy (March 13, 1951 – September 1, 2004) was an American Democratic Party politician who served in both houses of the New Jersey Legislature representing the 7th Legislative District, which covers portions of Burlington County and Camden County. He served in the General Assembly from 1984 to 1990, and was appointed to fill a vacancy in the New Jersey Senate, serving there from 1990 to 1992.

Born in Burlington, NJ, Foy was an honors graduate of Duke University (1973). Later, Foy attended Rutgers School of Law–Camden, graduating in 1977. Foy worked as an attorney specializing in labor relations. He had been general counsel to the New Jersey AFL-CIO in the 1980s, and was later employed as senior vice president of business development for Hill International, where he worked on issues relating to the firm's construction projects on the Tappan Zee Bridge and Interstate 287 in Westchester County, New York.

His first elected office was to the Burlington Township Council, where his brother would later serve as mayor. He was elected to the General Assembly and served there until 1990. He was named in November 1990 to fill a vacancy in the Senate left by Catherine A. Costa to become Director of the New Jersey Division of Alcoholic Beverage Control, and served there from 1990 to 1992. In a party convention in January 1991, Jack Casey was chosen to fill the remaining portion of the term remaining in the General Assembly seat that had been vacated by Foy the previous month.

In the wake of voter frustration with tax increases enacted by Governor of New Jersey James Florio in 1990, Foy supported legislation that would allow voters to vote their state legislators out of office by referendum. Florio later recalled Foy's contributions in getting the minimum wage increased in the state, saying that "New Jersey was ahead of the nation in getting a minimum wage of $5.15 an hour, and Tom was vital in its effort". Foy was deputy political director for Florio's successful 1989 run for governor.

Foy died at age 53 of a heart attack he suffered at a Washington, D.C. train station on September 1, 2004, while returning to New Jersey from a meeting with diplomats from the Middle East. He was survived by his wife and two children.

References

1951 births
2004 deaths
Democratic Party members of the New Jersey General Assembly
New Jersey city council members
Democratic Party New Jersey state senators
People from Burlington Township, New Jersey
Politicians from Burlington County, New Jersey
Rutgers School of Law–Camden alumni
20th-century American politicians